It's Alive! is a Canadian children's variety show that aired on YTV between 1994 and 1996. Coined "the least educational show on television", the show mainly consisted of comedy sketches, celebrity interviews, musical performances, game shows, and obstacle challenges. In its original six-episode first season, episodes were 1½ hours long, which also contained an episode of programs including Mighty Morphin Power Rangers, Are You Afraid of the Dark?, and Captain Scarlet and the Mysterons. Starting in the second season, the show was cut back to one hour with the television programs dropped from the show. In the fourth and final season, the show was cut to a half-hour. Most of the sketches and the obstacle courses were shot at various locations in Toronto, while the musical performances, game show segments, and celebrity interviews were done in front of a live studio audience full of children at YTV's studios in Toronto. A unique aspect of the show was the use of product placements including 3DO, Crispers, and Canada Games. The game show, Uh Oh!, which was inspired on a game show parody sketch during its second season, later became a spin-off show after It's Alive! ended in 1996.

References

External links
 

1990s Canadian children's television series
1990s Canadian comedy television series
1993 Canadian television series debuts
1997 Canadian television series endings
1990s Canadian variety television series
Canadian children's comedy television series
Television shows filmed in Toronto
YTV (Canadian TV channel) original programming
Canadian television shows featuring puppetry
Television series by Corus Entertainment
Television series by GRC Productions